J70 may refer to:
 J/70, a keelboat
 LNER Class J70, a British steam locomotive class
 Metabiaugmented truncated dodecahedron
 Toyota Land Cruiser (J70), a Japanese off-road vehicle